Hungry Bear Restaurant (also called the Golden Bear Lodge) is an American-style restaurant in the Critter Country land at Disneyland Park in Anaheim, California in the United States. There is also a location at Tokyo Disneyland. The restaurant is themed to the Country Bear Jamboree, but when the attraction closed down, Hungry Bear retained its name and theme.

History

The Hungry Bear Restaurant was originally named the Golden Bear Lodge. The Lodge opened in September 1972 in Bear Country in Disneyland. In 1977, the restaurant reopened as the Hungry Bear Restaurant.

Design

The Hungry Bear Restaurant is located in Critter Country, next to The Many Adventures of Winnie the Pooh. The restaurant is two stories. the restaurant has a rustic feel. Customers order their food at the counter and the food is brought to the customer at their table. The restaurant has patio dining, overlooking the Rivers of America.

Cuisine
 
The restaurant serves American cuisine and updates its menu with seasonal offerings, including themed foods based on special events and holidays at the park. Hungry Bear's signature dishes are a Lemon Bumblebee Cupcake and a Fried Green Tomato Sandwich. 

Salads include the Picnic Salad, which comprises turkey, berries, feta cheese, almonds, and strawberry vinaigrette. Entrées include a 1/3 pound chili cheeseburger topped with an onion ring, a turkey Caesar salad wrap, and a fried chicken sandwich with honey mustard. In 2018, Hungry Bear started serving Messy Melvin's Vegan Speciality Burger, a vegan burger topped with stewed vegetables and a side of french fries or cole slaw. Hungry Bear also serves chili, which Touring Plans describes as "pasty and bland" and the Picnic Salad as "pretty festive for theme park greens."

Like all Disney restaurants, Hungry Bear offers a children's menu, including healthier options like string cheese, sliced apples, nonfat yogurt, and crackers.

Hungry Bear offers funnel cakes as dessert offerings, including a classic funnel cake topped with powdered sugar. They also offer a churro-type funnel cake, topped with cinnamon sugar. In 2019, the restaurant introduced a Sizzlin' Hot Funnel Cake, which comprises a funnel cake topped with orange cheese sauce and crushed Flamin' Hot Cheetos.

Gallery

References

External links

Restaurants at Disneyland
Critter Country
1972 establishments in California
1977 establishments in California
Walt Disney Parks and Resorts restaurants